Tehran International Short Film Festival (TISFF) is a film festival held in Tehran every year in October with a focus on short films.

The festival was founded in 1983. From 2020 it is a qualifying festival for the Academy Awards® (Oscars) and  winner of the Grand Prix becomes eligible for the Oscar® consideration.

History 
TISFF started as a special section in the Fajr International Film Festival entitled "8mm and 16mm films” in the years 1979 to 1982. After the Iranian Youth Cinema Society, was established, the section became an independent film festival focusing on short films and amateur cinema to support young talents.

39th Edition 
the 39th Edition of TISFF will be held between 19 to 24 October in Tehran, Iran. submissions for the festival were open until 1 July 2021

Awards

37th Tehran International Short Film Festival (Jan 2021) 
National Competition:

 Best Fiction: Winged White Horse, by Mahyar Mandegar
 Best Experimental Film: Adapt, by Kamal Kachouian
 Best Documentary: Khoonyar Children, by Arman Gholipour Dashtaki
 Best Animation: Red Fire, by Mona Abdullah Shahi

International Competition:
 Best Fiction: Da Yie, by Anthony Nti
 Best Experimental Film: No Award
 Best Documentary: Kak Iraj, by Jamshid Farajvand
 Best Animation: Candela, by Marc Riba and Anna Solanas

36th Tehran International Short Film Festival (Nov 2019) 
National Competition:

 Best Fiction: Aziz, by Seyyed Mehdi Musavi Barzoki
 Best Experimental Film: When A Woman Seated beside a Vase of Flowers after 154 years would get tired, by Shahriar Hanife
 Best Documentary: Where the wind blows, by Mina Mashhadi Mahdi
 Best Animation: Tangle, by Maliheh Gholamzadeh
International Competition:
 Best Fiction: Super Comfort, by Kirsikka Saari
 Best Experimental Film: Places, by Claudia Barral Magaz
 Best Documentary: Histories of Wolves, by Agnes Meng
 Best Animation: Untravel, by Nikola Majdak Jr. and Ana Nedeljkovic

28th Tehran International Short Film Festival (Nov 2011)  
National Competition:

 Best Fiction: Bitter Milk, by Nasser Zamiri
 Best Experimental Film: Delete, by Kazem Mollaie
 Best Documentary: Charkh Nan, by Hossein Nazari
 Best Animation: Kimiagar, by Mehdi Khorramyan
International Competition:
 Best Fiction: Barbakan, by Bartlomiej Zmuda and Bitter Milk, by Nasser Zamiri
 Best Experimental Film: Planet Z, by Momoko Seto
 Best Documentary: I'm Going to Disneyland', by Antoine Blandin Best Animation: El Niño Miguel, by Nacho Martín Audience Award: Delete, by Kazem Mollaie 26th Tehran International Short Film Festival (Nov 2009) 

National Competition:

 Best Fiction: Tamame Vasaele Shakhsie Man Jabeja Shode, by Houman Seyyedi Best Experimental Film: Minus, by Kazem Mollaie Best Documentary: Morghe Sahar, by Mehdi Bagheri Best Animation: Gorgo Mish, by Mohammad Ali SoleymanzadehInternational Competition:
 Best Fiction: The Last Regal King Size, by Simon Hipkins Best Experimental Film: Minus, by Kazem Mollaie Best Documentary: What's your name, by Georges Salameh Best Animation: Face, by Frank Kako''

References

External links
Official Website

Film festivals in Iran
Iranian film awards
Awards established in 1983
1983 establishments in Iran
Annual events in Iran
Film festivals established in 1983
Short film festivals